Gilberto Amauri de Godoy Filho, known as Giba (born 23 December 1976), is a Brazilian former professional volleyball player who played as an outside hitter. For much of the 2000s, he was widely regarded as one of the best volleyball players in the world. During his professional career he played in Brazil, Italy, Russia, Argentina and briefly in the United Arab Emirates. He is mostly remembered for his successes with the national team.

With the Brazilian National Team he won a total of 8 South American Championships, 3 America's Cups, 8 World League titles, 3 World Grand Champions Cups, three World Championships (2002, 2006, 2010), a gold medal at the 2004 Summer Olympics and two silver medals at the 2008 and 2012 Summer Olympics, where he was the team's captain.

During summer 2014, Giba retired from professional volleyball at the age of 37.

Club career
Giba  debuted in his country for clubs such as Curitibano, Cocamar, Chapecó, São Caetano, Nipomed, Olympikus and Minas. He later moved to Italy, acquired by   Yahoo! Ferrara, playing the Italian Top Division (Serie A1). After two years with that team, he signed a contract with Noicom BreBanca Cuneo (2003). In 2006 he won the Italian Cup, and was named the Most Valuable Player of the competition. In the summer 2007 he left Italy to play with Iskra Odintsovo. After playing 2 years in Russia in 2009 Giba moved back to Brazil and played for Pinheiros where in the first season with the club he won a bronze medal of the Brazilian Superliga. Over the last years of his career he also played  for Club Ciudad de Bolívar in Argentina and briefly for Al-Nasr Dubai in the United Arab Emirates it is last club.

International career

1995–2001
Giba debuted for the Brazilian National Team at the age of 18 in 1995 and in that year already he won his first major title which was the South American Championship. As the result Brazil qualified to the World Grand Champions Cup in 1997 as the continental champion and eventually won the tournament. In the subsequent years Brazil came up short in both the 1998 World Championship in Japan, where they lost a 5-set semifinal against the two-time defending champions Italy and in 2000 Sydney Olympics where after winning their group without losing a match, Brazilian team was upset in the quarterfinals losing 1:3 to Argentina. In 2001 Giba won his first World League title, while Brazil beat 8-time winners Italy in the final.

2002–2007
The following years are described as the Golden Era of Brazilian volleyball where Giba was a leader of a team, coached by Bernardo Rezende, which featured such players as Dante, André, Gustavo, André Heller, Ricardo Garcia and Sérgio Santos. After losing the 2002 World League final to Russia in Belo Horizonte, the team won all of the next 11 major international competitions, including: 5 World League titles, 2 World Championships, 2 World Cups, the World Grand Champions Cup and the Olympic gold medal.

At the 2002 World Championship in Argentina, Brazil took revenge on both Italy (beating 3-time defending champions 3–2 in the quarterfinals) and Russia (winning in a dramatic five-set final). It was the first World Championships title for the Brazilian National Team in history. In 2003 led by Giba the Brazilian team won the first of five consecutive World League titles, beating Serbia and Montenegro in the final (31–29 in the fifth-set tie-break).

At the 2004 Summer Olympic Games in Athens, Giba was at his best helping Brazilian National Team to win its second gold medal in history and being voted the tournament's Most Valuable Player. On 29 August 2004, in front of 10,000 fans at the Peace and Friendship Stadium in Piraeus, the Brazilians overcame Italy 3:1 in the gold medal match. His tremendous form continued during the next couple of seasons when in addition to winning titles, Giba was also awarded the MVP trophies for his performance at the 2006 World League, the 2006 World Championship and the 2007 World Cup. In that period he was considered by many to be the best volleyball player in the world. In 2006 he was given Prêmio Brasil Olímpico as the best Brazilian athlete of the year.

2008–2012

In 2008 with 32 year old Giba still in the starting lineup Brazil began to lose its aura of invincibility. The first upset came in the final tournament of the World League held in Rio de Janeiro. Playing in front of the home crowd Brazil was expected to win sixth title in row. In the semifinal however they were shocked  by the United States losing the match 0:3. Later on that year Brazilian Team was able to reach the final of the Beijing Olympics, but again they lost to the US, this time in four sets. In a result Giba added a silver medal to the gold won four years earlier in Athens.

The following year Giba was included in a rebuilt squad which bounced back from the disappointing losses and regained the World League title. In the final played in Belgrade, Brazil faced Serbia and more than 22,000 of its supporters and won in a close five-setter. In 2010 Giba lost his spot in the starting lineup, as Rezende preferred to use younger Dante and Murilo as starting spikers. Giba however remained the team's captain and was still an important part of the national team, winning his eight World League title and the third World Championship in the tournament held in Italy.

In 2011, with Dante injured, Giba returned to the starting lineup and was close to add another World League title to his collection. He came up short however, as the Brazilian Team lost a close five-set final to Russia. At the 2012 London Olympics, with Giba again used mostly as a reserve captain,  Brazil was on its way to another gold medal. Leading 2:0 and having a commanding advantage in the third set in the final against Russia, Brazilians missed out on couple of match points and were eventually beaten in five sets. The loss meant that Giba's third Olympic medal turned out to be a silver. After the Olympics, he retired from the Brazilian national team.

Style of play
Giba is not very tall for a volleyball player but he made up his height limitation with his unique physical skills and jumping abilities. In his playing days he was considered one of the best wing spikers in the world. Giba was not only appreciated for his spectacular play but he also had desire, appeal and drive that made him loved by volleyball fans all over the world. He was named a captain of the national team because of his leadership skills. He was recognized for his highly energetic personality which was helping to motivate the whole Brazilian team to play its best. Brazil was considered nearly unbeatable in the 2000s and Giba was a big part of its success.

Personal life
Giba was born in Londrina, but raised in Curitiba. He works with children fighting leukemia. He was diagnosed with this disease when he was six months old.

In 2003–2012 he was married to the Romanian-Brazilian former international volleyball player, Cristina Pîrv. They have 2 children together, a daughter Nicoll (born 2004) and a son Patrick (born 2009). In November 2012, Cristina filed for divorce. In 2013 he started dating with Maria Luiza Dautt. Giba is fluent in three languages; Portuguese, English and Italian.

Commercial 
Giba has been involved in commercial campaigns of such brands as Vogue Italia, Nissan, Technos and Olympikus.

Social 
Giba has been supporting orphans and children suffering from cancer. He is active in the campaign against prostate cancer. Giba and his ex-wife Cristina Pirv, who was also a volleyball player, entered the campaign of the Institute Art of Living Well, against breast cancer. Giba has also celebrated Olympic day with 600 children from social projects in Rio de Janeiro. He is a president of the FIVB Athletes’ Commission. He is also active in social responsibility projects.

Media 
The Brazilian Olympic Committee produced a documentary under the title of Heróis Olímpicos for Giba. His autobiographic book titled Giba Neles! has been translated into two languages Polish and Italian.

Management 
Giba in 2016 selected as President of the FIVB Athletes Commission. The Commission is made up of 10 athletes from nine different countries representing both volleyball and beach volleyball and will be officially launched at the Volleyball House in Rio during the 2016 Olympic Games in the presence of the IOC and the IOC Athletes' Commission.

His Daughter 
Nicoll Pirv De Godoy (his daughter) currently dominates the volleyball sport in Morocco and plays in the local team of Rabat known as A.S.F.A.R. She plays as outside hitter and ever since her arrival, her team has managed to win every single game they played thanks to her great set of skills. She maintains her high standards through intensive daily volleyball training and regular visits to the gym. She hopes to become a very successful volleyball player just like her dad and make so much money that she can use it to help others in need.

Sporting achievements

Clubs

CEV Champions League
  2008/2009 – with Iskra Odintsovo

National Championships
 1999/2000  Brazilian Championship, with Minas Tênis Clube
 2000/2001  Brazilian Championship, with Minas Tênis Clube
 2005/2006  Italian Cup, with Bre Banca Lannutti Cuneo
 2007/2008  Russian Championship, with Iskra Odintsovo
 2008/2009  Russian Championship, with Iskra Odintsovo
 2009/2010  Brazilian Championship, with Pinheiros

National Team
 1993  FIVB U19 World Championship
 1995  FIVB U21 World Championship
 1995  South American Championship
 1997  South American Championship
 1997  FIVB World Grand Champions Cup
 1998  America's Cup
 1999  South American Championship
 1999  America's Cup
 2001  FIVB World League
 2001  South American Championship
 2001  America's Cup
 2002  FIVB World League
 2002  FIVB World Championship
 2003  FIVB World League
 2003  South American Championship
 2003  FIVB World Cup
 2004  FIVB World League
 2004  Olympic Games
 2005  FIVB World League
 2005  South American Championship
 2005  FIVB World Grand Champions Cup
 2006  FIVB World League
 2006  FIVB World Championship
 2007  FIVB World League
 2007  Pan American Games
 2007  South American Championship
 2007  FIVB World Cup
 2008  Olympic Games
 2009  FIVB World League
 2009  South American Championship
 2009  FIVB World Grand Champions Cup
 2010  FIVB World League
 2010  FIVB World Championship
 2011  FIVB World League
 2011  FIVB World Cup
 2012  Olympic Games

Individually

 1993 FIVB U19 World Championship – Most Valuable Player
 1995 FIVB U21 World Championship – Most Valuable Player
 2004 Olympic Games – Most Valuable Player
 2006 FIVB World League – Most Valuable Player
 2006 FIVB World Championship – Most Valuable Player
 2006 Prêmio Brasil Olímpico – Best athlete of the Year
 2007 Pan American Games – Most Valuable Player
 2007 South American Championship – Most Valuable Player
 2007 FIVB World Cup – Most Valuable Player
 2008 FIVB World League – Best Server
 2009 South American Championship – Best Spiker
 2010 Famous Magazine – Best Volleyball Player of the last Decade
 2011 State of Parana – Medal for promotion of Sports
 2011 Sky Sports – The most famous Volleyball player in the World
 2015 Fox Sports – Best men's Volleyball player of all Time
 2016 RCI Brasil – Best Sports Active

References

External links

 

1976 births
Living people
Sportspeople from Londrina
Brazilian men's volleyball players
Volleyball players at the 2000 Summer Olympics
Volleyball players at the 2004 Summer Olympics
Volleyball players at the 2008 Summer Olympics
Volleyball players at the 2012 Summer Olympics
Olympic volleyball players of Brazil
Olympic gold medalists for Brazil
Olympic silver medalists for Brazil
Brazilian sportspeople in doping cases
Volleyball players at the 2003 Pan American Games
Volleyball players at the 2007 Pan American Games
Olympic medalists in volleyball
Medalists at the 2012 Summer Olympics
Medalists at the 2008 Summer Olympics
Medalists at the 2004 Summer Olympics
Pan American Games bronze medalists for Brazil
Pan American Games gold medalists for Brazil
Pan American Games medalists in volleyball
Medalists at the 2003 Pan American Games
Medalists at the 2007 Pan American Games
Outside hitters